On January 6, 2015, the first day of the 114th United States Congress and two months after the 2014 U.S. House elections, the incoming House members held an election for its speaker. This was 123rd speaker election since the office was created in 1789. The incumbent, John Boehner, received 216 votes, a majority of the votes cast and was re-elected to office, despite a coordinated effort by Freedom Caucus Republicans to oust him.

Immediately after the election, the dean of the United States House of Representatives, John Conyers, administered the oath of office to the speaker. Boehner in turn administered the oath of office en masse to the rest of the members of the House. He resigned later that same year, triggering a speaker election in October.

Nominations 
The House Republicans met on November 13, 2014, and unanimously renominated John Boehner for the speakership of the House of Representatives. Representative Cathy McMorris Rodgers, the Chair of the House Republican Conference, placed Boehner's name in nomination on January 6, 2015.

The House Democrats, who met on November 18, 2014, chose unopposed Nancy Pelosi through a voice vote as the Minority Leader as well as nominee for speaker. Her name was placed in nomination on January 6, 2015, by Xavier Becerra, the Chair of the House Democratic Caucus.

January 6, 2015, after House Republican Conference Chair Cathy McMorris Rodgers nominated John Boehner and House Democratic Caucus Chair Xavier Becerra nominated Nancy Pelosi for the office of the speaker on behalf of their respective parties, three more names were placed in nominations by some of the Republican representatives. Ted Yoho of Florida was nominated by Thomas Massie of Kentucky, Louie Gohmert of Texas by Jim Bridenstine of Oklahoma, and Dan Webster of Florida by Steve King of Iowa.

Republican dissent 
Republican lawmakers took to social media to find support for a new speaker of the House. On January 6, Randy Weber tweeted support for Louis Gohmert in an attempt to take votes from John Boehner. Justin Amash went on Facebook to rally for support for a new candidate. He stated that the Republican Majority in Congress would have more leverage against Barack Obama with a new speaker. Thomas Massie of Kentucky told reporters they wanted to push to vote to a second ballot. A second ballot for the speaker of the House had not happened since 1923.

Election of the speaker
The vote count in the January 6, 2015, speaker of the House election was: 

Representatives voting for someone other than their party's speaker nominee were:
 Rod Blum of Iowa; Scott Garrett of New Jersey; Paul Gosar of Arizona; Tim Huelskamp of Kansas; Walter Jones of North Carolina; Steve King of Iowa; Mark Meadows of North Carolina; Rich Nugent of Florida; Bill Posey of Florida; Scott Rigell of Virginia; Marlin Stutzman of Indiana; and Daniel Webster of Florida voted for Daniel Webster;
 Jim Bridenstine of Oklahoma; Louie Gohmert of Texas; and Randy Weber of Texas voted for Louie Gohmert;
 Thomas Massie of Kentucky and Ted Yoho of Florida voted for Ted Yoho;
 Justin Amash of Michigan and Scott DesJarlais of Tennessee voted for Jim Jordan;
 Gwen Graham of Florida voted for Jim Cooper;
 Dan Lipinski of Illinois voted for Peter DeFazio;
 Dave Brat of Virginia voted for Jeff Duncan;
 Jeff Duncan of South Carolina voted for Trey Gowdy;
 Kyrsten Sinema of Arizona voted for John Lewis;
 Chris Gibson of New York voted for Kevin McCarthy;
 Curt Clawson of Florida voted for Rand Paul, who was not a member of the House at the time;
 Gary Palmer of Alabama voted for Jeff Sessions, who was not a member of the House at the time;
 Jim Cooper of Tennessee voted for Colin Powell, who was not a member of the House at the time.

On the day of the election, January 6, there were a total of 434 representatives in office, Michael Grimm of New York having resigned from his seat, and Boehner would have needed at least 218 votes to win had all of them voted. However, 26 representatives did not participate in the voting, including 13 New York Democrats who attended the funeral of the late former New York Governor Mario Cuomo that day. Inclement weather also stopped some politicians from traveling for the vote. As a result, the number of votes necessary for a majority was lower, 205 rather than 218.

References

Speaker of the House election
Speaker of the House election
Nancy Pelosi
Speaker of the House election
Speaker January
2015